František Janda-Suk (March 25, 1878 – June 23, 1955) was a Czech athlete who competed for Bohemia in the 1900 Summer Olympics and in the 1912 Summer Olympics and Czechoslovakia at the 1924 Summer Olympics.

He was born in Postřižín near Roudnice nad Labem and died in Prague.

In the 1900 Summer Olympics held in Paris, France, where he won the silver medal in the discus throw.

He was the first modern athlete to throw the discus while rotating the whole body. He invented this technique when studying the position of the famous statue of Discobolus. After only one year of developing the technique he gained the olympic silver.

At the 1912 Summer Olympics in Stockholm, Sweden he was 15th in shot put and 17th in discus throw .

References

External links 

1878 births
1955 deaths
Czech male discus throwers
Czech male shot putters
Olympic athletes of Bohemia
Athletes (track and field) at the 1900 Summer Olympics
Athletes (track and field) at the 1912 Summer Olympics
Athletes (track and field) at the 1920 Summer Olympics
Olympic silver medalists for Bohemia
Olympic silver medalists for Czechoslovakia
People from Mělník District
Medalists at the 1900 Summer Olympics
Olympic silver medalists in athletics (track and field)
Sportspeople from the Central Bohemian Region
Sportspeople from the Austro-Hungarian Empire